Tavush (Tovuz, Tauz, Touzkend) is a village in the Berd Municipality of the Tavush Province of Armenia.

History of name 
First time, the name of village was written in "History of Armenia" of Movses Khorenatsi, in legend of Vardges Manuk. There it was called Tuhq. By historian Artashes Shahnazaryan in old times people called village in that way.

Till 2006 village was called Tovuz, by the name of station in Azerbaijan. After 2006 it was called Tavush.

Gallery

References

External links 

Populated places in Tavush Province